The Widderfeld Stock is a mountain of the Urner Alps, located on the border between the Swiss cantons of Nidwalden and Obwalden. It is located between the valleys of Melchtal and Engelberg.

References

External links
 Widderfeld Stock on Hikr

Mountains of the Alps
Mountains of Obwalden
Mountains of Nidwalden
Nidwalden–Obwalden border
Mountains of Switzerland
Two-thousanders of Switzerland
Kerns, Switzerland